is a city located in Fukuoka Prefecture, Japan. As of 2016, the city has an estimated population of 41,348 and a population density of 2,600 persons per km². The total area is 15.98 km². It is perhaps best known as the birthplace of actor Ken Takakura.

Location
It is located along the Onga River, with Mizumaki Town to the north, Kitakyushu City's Yahata-nishi Ward to the east, Nogata City to the south, and Kurate Town to the west.

Education
The city currently has 6 elementary schools, 4 junior high-schools, and 2 high schools.

Facilities
The city is located on the Kyushu Railway Company (JR Kyushu) Fukuhoku Yutaka Line with Nakama (opened on August 30, 1891) and Chikuzen-Habu (opened April 26, 1935) stations.  There is also a tram (Chikuhō Electric Railroad Line) with stations at Toritani, Higashi-Nakama, Chikuho-Nakama, and Dotenouchi.

Habu Park is the largest park in Nakama, with many cherry blossom trees. The Roofless Museum (Yane No Nai Hakubutsukan), near the JR Nakama Station, is a small green park area with sculptures by artists from around the world. The city is known locally for its AEON (formerly Daiei) "Shoppers Mall" - a mall with shops, restaurants, a movie theatre (formerly United Cinemas International), a bowling alley, and game centres.

Festivals
Chikuzen Nakama Cherry Blossom Festival (end of March - beginning of April) at Habu Park. Kisshoji Temple Wisteria Festival (located in Yahatanishi, near Nakama High School, and held April 27–29. Chikuzen Nakamagawa Festival - held in the Obon season every year on August 15. Includes a fireworks festival and food/game stalls as well. Chikuzen Nakama Yatchare Festival, previously held near Onga River, but now at Harmony Hall, Nakama's biggest festival of the year on the third weekend of October.

History
The city was involved in the coal mining industry of the Chikuho region from the Edo to Showa eras.  During the war, there was a POW camp in the city area, with inmates involved in mining. The city itself was incorporated on November 1, 1958.

There were plans for amalgamation, with the city becoming a ward of Kitakyushu, which would have become Nakama-ku, Kitakyushu. A recent poll (December 2004) stated that 70% of the citizens of Nakama were in favor of the city being absorbed into Kitakyushu. However, on Christmas Eve 2004 Nakama city councilors rejected the merger plan, despite it having initially been proposed by Nakama. The councilors claim that they are rejecting the merger for the good of the city. The suspected main reason was that only 3 of the 21 councilors would be retained afterwards.

Gallery

References

External links

 Nakama City official website 
 Nakama at Wikimapia

 
Cities in Fukuoka Prefecture